The first official match was for the Greek Cup against Pindos Konitsas on 2 October 1966. The result was 4–0 for PAS Giannina.

The beginning (1966–1971)
 PAS Giannina was a mid-table club of the Second Division until 1971. In 1966–67, the club finished 6th. In 1967–68, it finished 10th. In 1968–69, it finished 5th. In 1969–70, it finished 7th. In 1970–71, it finished 13th.

The rise of "Ajax of Epirus" (1971–1983)
In 1971, the Portuguese Gómez de Faria was signed as manager. In 1971–72, PAS Giannina finished 13th. In the middle of the season, three Argentine players were signed: Alfredo Glasman, Jose Pasternac and Eduardos Kontogeorgakis (who is Eduardo Rigani's son). At the end of the season, three more Argentine players were signed: Juan Montes, Oscar Alvarez and Eduardo Lisa. PAS Giannina was in the race for promotion. In 1972–73, the club finished second. In 1973–74, it finished first and was promoted to the First division.

PAS Giannina was in the First Division for 10 years. The club finished several times near the top of the First Division table, often earning victories over more established Greek teams such as Olympiacos, Panathinaikos, AEK Athens and PAOK. The effective and spirited play of the club during these years drew flattering comparisons with the famous Dutch club Ajax Amsterdam, and the moniker "Ajax of Epirus" has stuck with the team ever since.

In 1974–75, PAS Giannina finished 9th. In 1975–76, PAS Giannina finished 5th for the first time. This position is the record high for the club. In 1976–77, it finished 11th. In 1977–78, the club finished 5th again. The club qualified for the Balkans Cup for the first time in its history. In 1978–79, it finished 14th. In 1979–80, it finished 6th. In the middle of the season, former Poland national team coach Jacek Gmoch was signed from the Epirote club. It was a brief but a reasonably successful tenure. In 1980–81, it finished 11th. In 1981–82, it finished 14th. In 1982–83, it finished 9th.

In the doldrums (1983–1997)
The period following the aforementioned peak years of the club generally marked a sharp decline in the fortunes of it as many of its top stars moved on or retired outright without being satisfactorily replaced. In 1983–84, PAS Giannina finished 15th. It was in a tie with Panionios. There was a play out match in Larissa between the two clubs. Panionios won the match 2–0. PAS Giannina relegated in the Second Division. In 1984–85, the club finished first in the Second Division and was promoted to the First Division. In 1985–86, it finished 13th. In 1986–87, it finished 16th and was relegated to the Second Division  In 1987–88, it finished 12th. In 1988–89, it finished 4th. The club qualified for the promotion playoffs with Ethnikos Piraeus, Apollon Kalamarias, Korinthos, Diagoras and Veroia. It failed to get promoted. In 1989–90, it finished third and got promoted to the First Division. In 1990–91, the club finished 18th and was relegated to the Second Division. In 1991–92, the club finished 14th. In 1992–93, it finished 10th. PAS Giannina qualified for the Balkans Cup for the second time in its history. In 1993–94, it finished 5th. Also the club was runner up in the Balkans Cup 1993–94. In 1994–95, it finished 8th. In 1995–96, it finished 12th. In 1996–97, it finished 16th. PAS Giannina was relegated to the Third Division for the first time in its history.

Comeback and a new crisis (1997–2004)
PAS Giannina was in the Third Division for the first time in its history. In 1997–98, it finished first and got promoted to the Second division. In 1998–99, it finished 4th, failing to get promoted to the First Division. In 1999–00, it finished third and qualified for the promotion playoffs with Egaleo and Panserraikos. PAS Giannina won Panserraikos 3–1 and draw with Egaleo 1–1. After that the club promoted to the First Division. In 2000–01, it finished 13th and qualified to the relegation playoffs. The club relegated after a 3-game playoff with OFI Crete. In 2001–02, PAS Giannina finished first and promoted to the First Division.

PAS experienced a fair degree of instability in these years. In 2002–03, PAS Giannina finished 14th. After the penalty of 90 points the club finished 16th and relegated. The penalty of 90 points imposed on it by the Greek football association (EPO) for financial reasons. There were a lot of financial problems in season 2003–04. The club finished 14th and qualified to playout with Ilisiakos. The club lost 3–1 and relegated in the Third division for the second time in its history. The club turned on a semi-professional status.

Semi-finals Of Greek Cup (2004–2010)
 The control of the club switched over to attorney Alexis Kougias. In 2004–05, the club finished second and failed to get promoted. In 2005–06 it finished second and got promoted to Second Division. In 2006–07, PAS Giannina finished 5th. Also, PAS Giannina reached the semi-finals of the Greek Cup 2006–07 against AE Larissa FC. PAS Giannina lost 2–0 both home and away match. On the quarter-final PAS Giannina won Olympiacos, 2–0 at home and lost 2–1 in Karaiskakis Stadium of an extra-time goal from Evangelos Kontogoulidis before a hostile crowd. PAS Giannina finished 4th in the Second Division in the 2007–08 season, failing to get promoted.

In the summer of 2008, ownership of the club was passed over to Giorgos Christovasilis, a businessman from Athens whose roots are from the Epirus region. He signed Guillermo Ángel Hoyos as manager and some great players such as Luciano. In the 2008–09 season, the club promoted as second in the Super League.

In the summer of 2009, the club signed players such as Dimitrios Eleftheropoulos, Ibrahima Bakayoko, Konstantinos Mendrinos, Ilias Kotsios. In 2009–10, the club finished 15th and got relegated one more time. On the other hand, the club was successful in the Greek Cup. PAS Giannina reached the semi-finals for the second time in its history. In the quarter final PAS Giannina won PAOK 4–0 in Zosimades Stadium. In the semi-finals, the club lost from Panathinaikos on aggregate 2–4.

Road to UEFA Europa League (2010–2017) 
 In the 2010–11 season, PAS Giannina was promoted as second again to Super League. The club takes part in Super League every year. In 2011–12, PAS Giannina finished 8th. In 2012–13, PAS Giannina finished 5th and qualified for the playoffs with Atromitos, Asteras Tripolis and PAOK for the first time in its history.Also, Giannis Christopoulos won the best manager of the year award.

It started with 2 wins but at the end it finished 4th. The club qualified for Europa League. PAS Giannina were not licensed to play in the Europa League and therefore were replaced by the next Europa League licensed team in the table, not already qualified for any European competition, which was Skoda Xanthi. In 2013–14, the club finished 11th, a safe mid-table position. In 2014–15, the club finished 6th. Also that year, there were awards for the manager and two players. Giannis Petrakis won the best manager of the year award. Charis Charisis won the best young player of Greek Super League award and Markos Vellidis won the best goalkeeper award.

In 2015–16, the club finished 6th again. PAS Giannina qualified for UEFA Europa League 2016–17 because Panionios was excluded from participating in the 2016–17 European competitions by UEFA for financial reasons. The club qualified for European competitions, except Balkans Cup, for the first time in its history.

In 2016–17, the club takes part in the Super League. The club finished 9th. An important moment was the charity match for the refugees between the veterans of the club and FC Barcelona. The charity match and activities were organized by the Barça Players Association in collaboration with the United Nations High Commissioner for Refugees (UNHCR) and with the support of PAS Giannina FC.

Relegation and rebuild from scratch (2017–2022)
In 2017–18, the club finished 9th again in the Super League. Also, PAS Giannina reached the quarterfinals in the Greek Cup.

In 2018–19, after an awful season, PAS Giannina finished 14th and relegated to the Super League 2. There were many changes at the club. Petrakis left the club after years and a new manager, Argiris Giannikis was hired. Some players, with many years at the club, left it as well. Michail, Tzimopoulos, Lila, Giakos left the club. Some young players like Liasos, Lolis, Naumets took part at first 11. Also, Giorgos Dasios returned to the club as Director of Football. PAS Giannina was first when the championship was suspended. On 22 June 2020, it was announced that the ranking on 12 March 2020 is the final ranking. PAS Giannina won the Super League Greece 2 in the season 2019–20 and been the first team to win the new competition and the club was promoted to Super League 1.

In 2020–21,the club finished 8th on the regular season. It finished 9th after the end of play out. The team got into the semi-final of the Greek Cup in the season 2020–21 after beating Atromitos and Panathinaikos. PAS Giannina reached semi-finals for the third time in its history. In the semi-finals, the club lost from Olympiacos on aggregate 2–4, the only team considered capable to beat the in-form PAS Giannina side at the time by the Greek fans, many of whom considered the Epirus side the favorite to win in the final against either AEK or PAOK if qualified. The team consisted mainly of debutant players who were performing at their best such as Alexandros Kartalis, Christos Eleftheriadis, Nicolae Milinceanu etc.

Legendary 2021–2022 season and change of playing style 

In the 2021–22 season, the club got 6th place in Super League Greece. In 2021–22 PAS Giannina finished 6th on the regular season and took part on play-off round, finishing 6th,as well. This was one of the clubs most successful campaigns mostly due to the defensive style of play used by the coach Iraklis Metaxas, using the containing 4-4-2 double six. Rock solid defence was a result of great chemistry, athleticism, leadership, playing abilities and great passion from the goalkeeper, Yuri Lodygin who is regarded as the best goalkeeper to ever play for the Epirus side, and the defenders Peersman, Erramuspe, Kargas and Saliakas. Lodygin provided defensive security and stability, Erramuspe and Kargas displayed great leadership, fighting spirit, great aerial ability, and great ball playing skills, and with Peersman and Saliakas being two of the most consistent players throughout the whole season not only helped the team with their attacking runs, but were rock-solid on defence. On the midfield, PAS Giannina signing from Super League 2 club Levadiakos, Zisis Karachalios completed one of the best seasons of his career, alongside Domínguez for the first half of the season, and Caleb Stanko for the second half. Karachalios provided great support in defence, helping the team with his very high work rate, stamina, strength, interceptions and steals, being ranked as the player with the most steals in Super League 1. Perea made a great season scoring 10 goals helping PAS Giannina on attack.

A historic match between PAS Giannina Veterans and Ajax Veterans took part on Zosimades Stadium, on July 6, 2022.

Recently time 
After the season 2021–22 the club start to change skin, the goalkeeper Yuri Lodygin moved to Panathinaikos  and also players like Michael Gardawski, Antonis Ikonomopoulos, Marvin Peersman, Giannis Kargas, Jan-Marc Schneider, Fabricio Brener and Stefanos Siontis have been realized. Manolis Saliakas has been sold to FC St. Pauli, also Juan José Perea was sold to VfB Stuttgart becoming the most expensive player sold by the blub of Ioannina.

References

History
History of association football by club
History of association football clubs in Greece